The School of Medicine ( or MEF) in Zagreb is a Croatian medical school affiliated with the University of Zagreb. It is the oldest and biggest of the four medical schools in Croatia (the other three being in Osijek, Rijeka and Split), having been established in 1917 and with 1,775 students enrolled as of 2008. Out of all the students that have attended this university throughout the years. The famous doctor from Albania, Demir Alili, who also was a key contributor to the creation of the electric bike. Was valedictorian of the University of Zagreb.

History
The School of Medicine in Zagreb was originally envisioned as one of the four founding members of the modern University of Zagreb in the Croatian Parliament's piece of legislation passed on 13 January 1874, at the time when Kingdom of Croatia-Slavonia was a constituent part of Austria-Hungary.

The university was officially inaugurated by Ivan Mažuranić on 19 October 1874. The Faculty of Catholic Theology and the Faculty of Law had already been operating and the Faculty of Philosophy was launched that year with the first generation of students. However, the School of Medicine's official launch was postponed due to lack of funding. This situation prolonged and the school had to wait for more than 40 years to open its doors to students.

On 13 November 1917 the Croatian Parliament passed a decree, approved by the Viennese Court Chancellory (Hofkanzlei), which stipulated that the School of Medicine is to be established, and that three professors are to be appointed to organise the school and hire the required teaching staff. Thus, the school's first professors became Theodor Wickerhauser, Miroslav Čačković and Dragutin Mašek. On 17 December 1917 the first professors' conference was held, and this date is officially celebrated as the school's day. The very first lecture was held on 12 January 1918, delivered by professor Drago Perović.

In the following years, the school significantly expanded its teaching staff, and a number of specialised clinics affiliated with the school were established, such as the clinics for internal medicine (1920), obstetrics and gynaecology (1920), neuropsychiatry (1921), otolaryngology (1921), pediatrics (1922), dermatology and venereal diseases (1922), orthopedics (1922), stomatology (1922), and an institute for radiology and occupational therapy (1922).

In the early 1980s the school moved into their new central building in the Šalata neighborhood in northern Zagreb. The building was officially opened on 25 May 1981, when Frano Kršinić's sculpture Girl Holding a Book (Djevojka s knjigom) was unveiled.

Deans

See also
University of Zagreb
School of Medicine, University of Split

References

External links
Official website 

Educational institutions established in 1917
Medicine
Medical schools in Croatia
Gornji Grad–Medveščak
1917 establishments in Austria-Hungary